Bashkim Sukaj (Baškim Sukaj; born 20 March 1992) is a Swiss former professional footballer of Kosovan-Albanian origin.

External links
 

1992 births
Swiss people of Kosovan descent
Swiss people of Albanian descent
Living people
Swiss men's footballers
Association football forwards
FC Lausanne-Sport players
Yverdon-Sport FC players
FC Le Mont players
FC Vevey United players
FC Bulle players
Swiss Super League players
Swiss Challenge League players
Swiss Promotion League players
2. Liga Interregional players